Baikalodrilus is a genus of annelids belonging to the family Naididae.

The species of this genus are found in Russia.

Species:
 Baikalodrilus alienus Timm, 1998 
 Baikalodrilus bekmanae (Snimschikova, 1984)

References

Naididae